Ernesto Hernández (born 26 July 1985) is a Uruguayan professional footballer who plays as a goalkeeper.

External links 
 

1985 births
Living people
Uruguayan footballers
Uruguayan expatriate footballers
Uruguayan Primera División players
Categoría Primera A players
Categoría Primera B players
Torneo Federal A players
Peruvian Segunda División players
Sud América players
Club Atlético River Plate (Montevideo) players
Peñarol players
El Tanque Sisley players
Uniautónoma F.C. footballers
Atlético Huila footballers
Deportivo Cali footballers
Águilas Doradas Rionegro players
Deportivo Pasto footballers
Centro Atlético Fénix players
Envigado F.C. players
Atlético Grau footballers
Cortuluá footballers
Uruguayan expatriate sportspeople in Colombia
Uruguayan expatriate sportspeople in Argentina
Uruguayan expatriate sportspeople in Peru
Expatriate footballers in Colombia
Expatriate footballers in Argentina
Expatriate footballers in Peru
Association football goalkeepers